Dattopant Bapurao Thengadi, (Marathi: दत्तोपंत ठेंगडी, 1920–2004) was an Indian Hindu Ideologue, trade union leader and founder of the Swadeshi Jagaran Manch, Bharatiya Mazdoor Sangh and the Bharatiya Kisan Sangh. He is one of the foremost ideologues of Swadeshi economics. He was born in the village of Arvi in Wardha district in Maharashtra.

Thengadi was a full-time Rashtriya Swayamsevak Sangh pracharak until his death on 14 October 2004. The kind of impact he left on the social and economic life of India was unique, and set the tone for generations to come. He has been one of the foremost advocates of the hallmark qualities of his lifestyle: simple living, in-depth study, deep thinking, clarity of thought, courage of the conviction and missionary zeal for the goal. He was awarded with Padma Bhushan but refused to accept it.

Early history
Dattopant Thengadi (Dattatreya Bapurao Thengadi) was born in the village of Arvi (Wardha, Maharashtra) on Deepawali, 10 November 1920. He studied law at  Law College in Nagpur. He finished his post-graduation from Morris College and LLB from Law College in Nagpur. He was a lawyer as well as a philosopher, and
displayed an early talent for administration. At the age of 15, he served as president of the ‘Vanar Sena’ as well as the Municipal High School student union at Arvi. He actively took part in India's Freedom Movement and was a member of the Hindustan Socialist Republican Association (HSRA) from 1936-38. He became a full-time Pracharak in 1942. He worked as organizing secretary of the Indian National Trade Union Congress (INTUC) from 1950–51, and was also associated with the Postal & Railway Workers Union (Communist Party). He was organising secretary of the Bharatiya Jana Sangh for Madhya Pradesh (1952-53) and south India (1956-57). 

He was profoundly influenced by Sh. Madhavrao Sadashivrao Golwalkar, popularly known as Guruji. Some of the other towering figures of the time who influenced his persona are Babasaheb Ambedkar and Pt. Deendayal Upadhyaya. He always kept pace with time by establishing various organizations in different spheres, and maintained the core philosophy of Hindu Dharma and Bhartiya Darshan.

Founder of organisations
Thengadi founded, nurtured and energized some of the well-known organizations of today: Bharatiya Mazdoor Sangh (1955), Bharatiya Kisan Sangh (1979), Swadeshi Jagran Manch (1991), Samajik Samarasata Manch, Sarva- panth Samadar Manch and Paryavaran Manch; also a founder member of Akhil Bharatiya Vidyarthi Parishad, Akhil Bharatiya Adhivakta Parishad, Akhil Bharatiya Grahak Panchayat and Bharatiya Vichara Kendra.

In Parliament
He was the member of the Rajya Sabha from Bharatiya Jana Sangh for two terms during 1964-76, also served as its
vice-chairman in 1968-70, always left his indelible imprints on all the tasks he handled as parliamentarian. Thengadi showed his leadership capabilities by organizing the anti-Emergency movement in 1975, by way bringing together various political streams.

Travel
A widely traveled man, within India he practically travelled almost every district place in the country if not taluka and village. He also visited foreign shores, which includes- Soviet Union
and Hungary as member of a parliamentary delegation (1969), Geneva, Switzerland to attend Second International Anti-Apartheid Conference at Geneva (1979). He was invited in USA, Canada, Britain and Yugoslavia in 1979 to study the impact of liberalization on trade union movement. His conviction also took him to, China, Jakarta, Bangladesh, Burma, Thailand, Malaysia, Singapore, Kenya, Uganda and Tanzania, on various occasions.

An erudite orator, expert in the social, economic and political issues, his soft but forcefully
presentations of the issues always kept the audience spellbound. Disenchanted with both
the western models of development, namely, Capitalism and Socialism, he propounded
the ‘Third Way’ of socio-economic development based on the ideology of ‘Sanatan Dharma’.
He authored many books which grew not only from his ideological conviction but also from
his first hand experience, some of his widely read and referred works are: The Third Way;
Modernization Without Westernization; What Sustains Sangh?, Our National Renaissance,
It's Directions and Destination; Nationalist Pursuit; The great sentinel and The Perspective.

Death and condolence
Dattopant Thengadi died on 14 October 2004 due to Brain Hemorrhage via Mahanirvaan. Great personalities of India and world gave him tribute.

Atal Bihari Vajpayee

L.K. Advani

Ashok Singhal

References

 Dattopant Thengadi -- An efficient organisation builder 

 

1920 births
2004 deaths
People from Wardha district
Rashtriya Swayamsevak Sangh pracharaks
Rajya Sabha members from Uttar Pradesh
Trade unionists from Maharashtra
20th-century Indian politicians